John Andreas Bufton (born 31 August 1962 in Llanidloes) is a former UK Independence Party (UKIP) Member of the European Parliament (MEP) for Wales, from 2009 to 2014, when he stood down.

Early life
Bufton was educated at Elan Village Primary School and Llandrindod Wells High School, and joined the family haulage business before embarking on a career managing a residential care home for the elderly with the local authority.

Political career
Bufton's political career began when he was elected onto Rhayader Town Council in 1987. In 1995, he was elected to Powys County Council. In the 1997 General Election, he ran for the Referendum Party in the Montgomeryshire constituency.

In 2000, he ran as UKIP candidate in the Ceredigion by-election, coming fifth with 1.9% of the vote. He also ran for UKIP in the 2005 General Election, 2007 Welsh Assembly Elections and 2008 Powys County Council election.

In 2009, Bufton became UKIP's first MEP for Wales, picking up the fourth available seat from Labour. Bufton was appointed to serve on the Committee on Regional Development, at the European Parliament. In May 2013, Bufton announced his intention to stand down at the next European elections. He was replaced by Nathan Gill.

References

1962 births
Living people
UK Independence Party parliamentary candidates
Members of Powys County Council
People from Llanidloes
Referendum Party politicians
UK Independence Party MEPs
MEPs for Wales 2009–2014
People educated at Ysgol Calon Cymru